DMO may refer to:
  Dilute Magnetic Oxide, a type of functional semiconducting oxide with applications in Spintronics
 Debt Management Office, an executive agency of the United Kingdom government
 Defence Materiel Organisation, a former agency of the government of Australia
 Destination Management Organization, a program of the government of Indonesia; see Tourism in Indonesia#Destination Management Organization
 Destination marketing organization, an organization that promotes a place in order to increase the number of visitors
 Digimon Masters Online, a massively multiplayer online role-playing video game
 Director of Military Operations, a position at the UK War Office
 DirectX Media Objects, a multimedia software API from Microsoft
 Domodedovo Airlines, a former airline, headquartered at Domodedovo International Airport in Moscow
 Kemezung language, a language native to Cameroon with ISO 639-3 code dmo
 Warhammer 40,000: Dark Millennium Online, a multiplayer role-playing video game
 DMO Social Media influencer who posts to Instagram,YouTube,Twitter